A11, A 11 or A-11 may refer to:

Military
 Aero A.11, a Czechoslovakian bomber produced before World War II
 Consolidated A-11, an attack version of the Consolidated P-30 fighter plane of the 1930s
 HMS A11, an A-class submarine of the Royal Navy
 Matilda Mk I, a British Army infantry tank
 Aggregate 11, a proposed military rocket of Nazi Germany
 A-11 Ghibli, the Italian designation for the AMX International AMX

Roads
A11 road, in several countries

Other uses
 Apollo 11
 A-11 offense, an American Football shotgun formation involving 2 quarterbacks and 9 other potentially eligible receivers
 Arrows A11, a 1989 British racing car
 ATC code A11 Vitamins, a subgroup of the Anatomical Therapeutic Chemical Classification System
 British NVC community A11 (Potamogeton pectinatus - Myriophyllum spicatum community), a British Isles plant community
 Chery A11, a 1999 Chinese car
 HLA-A11, an HLA-A serotype
 American Airlines Flight 11, a plane that was hijacked and crashed into the World Trade Center in the September 11 attacks
 English Opening, Encyclopaedia of Chess Openings code
 Apple A11, an ARM SoC mobile processor designed by Apple.
 "A-11", a 1963 country song written by Hank Cochran